Mohammadabad (also Romanized as Moḩammadābād; also known as Ḩājj Moḩammad Ebrāhīm) is a village in Deris Rural District, in the Central District of Kazerun County, Fars Province, Iran. At the 2006 census, its population was 184, in 34 families.

References 

Populated places in Kazerun County